Ramble Jon Krohn (born May 27, 1976), better known by his stage name RJD2, is an American musician based in Columbus, Ohio. He is the owner of record label RJ's Electrical Connections. He has been a member of groups such as Soul Position, MHz Legacy, and Icebird. His stage name derives from the popular Star Wars droid R2-D2.

Life and career
Born in Eugene, Oregon, Krohn was raised in Columbus, Ohio. He began making music in 1993.

In 2002, RJD2 signed to El-P's record label Definitive Jux and released his debut solo studio album, Deadringer, to much acclaim. RJD2 later collaborated with rapper Blueprint under the name Soul Position, releasing 8 Million Stories on Rhymesayers Entertainment in 2003.

He released his second solo studio album, Since We Last Spoke, on Definitive Jux in 2004. Soul Position's second album, Things Go Better with RJ and AL, was released in 2006 under Rhymesayers Entertainment. 2006 also saw the release of Magnificent City, his collaborative album with rapper Aceyalone. Magnificent City includes "A Beautiful Mine", which has been used in the titles of Mad Men.

In 2007, RJD2 released the solo studio album, The Third Hand, on XL Recordings. In 2010, he released his fourth solo studio album, The Colossus, on his own label RJ's Electrical Connections. In 2011, he released the album, We Are the Doorways, under the pseudonym The Insane Warrior.

RJD2 formed Icebird with Aaron Livingston, vocalist of a Philadelphia-based band called The Mean. The duo's debut album, The Abandoned Lullaby, was released in 2011. In 2013, RJD2 released his fifth solo studio album, More Is Than Isn't, on RJ's Electrical Connections.

In 2015, RJD2 released a collaborative album with rapper STS, titled STS x RJD2. His sixth solo studio album, Dame Fortune, was released in 2016.

In 2020, he released his seventh solo studio album, The Fun Ones, on RJ's Electrical Connections. It features guest appearances from Aceyalone, Homeboy Sandman, Jordan Brown, Khari Mateen, and STS.

He released a course on sampling and arranging, RJD2: From Samples to Songs, with online music school Soundfly on July 27, 2021.

Discography

Studio albums
 Deadringer (2002)
 Since We Last Spoke (2004)
 Magnificent City (2006) 
 The Third Hand (2007)
 The Colossus (2010)
 We Are the Doorways (2011) 
 The Abandoned Lullaby (2011) 
 More Is Than Isn't (2013)
 STS x RJD2 (2015) 
 Dame Fortune (2016)
 Tendrils (2018) 
 The Fun Ones (2020)
 Escape from Sweet Auburn (2022) (with STS)

Compilation albums
 In Rare Form: Unreleased Instrumentals (2004)
 The Third Hand Instrumentals (2007)
 Inversions of the Colossus (2010)
 In Rare Form, Vol. 2 (2018)

Mix albums
 Your Face or Your Kneecaps (2001)
 Loose Ends (2003)
 Lobster and Scrimp (2003)
 Constant Elevation (2005)

EPs
 Pryor Convictions (2000) 
 The Horror (2003)
 The Mashed Up Mixes (2004)
 Tin Foil Hat (2009)
 The Glow Remixes (2011)

Singles
 "June" / "The Proxy" (2001)
 "Rain" / "Find You Out" (2002)
 "Here's What's Left" (2002)
 "Let the Good Times Roll" (2002)
 "The Horror" / "Final Frontier (Remix)" (2003)
 "Sell the World" / "Ghostwriter (Remix)" (2003)
 "1976" (2004)
 "Through the Walls" (2004)
 "Exotic Talk" (2004)
 "Fire" (2005) 
 "Superhero" (2006) 
 "You Never Had It So Good" (2007)
 "No Helmet Up Indianola" (2020)

Guest appearances
 Pigeon John – "The Last Sunshine" from And the Summertime Pool Party (2006)
 Lushlife + CSLSX – "Toynbee Suite" from Ritualize (2016)

Productions
 Aesop Rock – "Kill 'Em All Remix" (2001)
 Cage – "Among the Sleep" from Movies for the Blind (2002)
 Mos Def/Diverse/Prefuse 73 – "Wylin Out (RJD2 Remix)" (2002)
 Souls of Mischief – "Spark" (2002)
 El-P – "Lazerfaces' Warning (RJD2 Remix)" from Fandam Plus (2002)
 Massive Attack – "Butterfly Caught (RJD2 Remix)" (2002)
 Murs – "Sore Losers" from The End of the Beginning (2003)
 Viktor Vaughn – "Saliva" from Vaudeville Villain (2003)
 The Weathermen – "5 Left in the Clip (RJD2 Remix)" from The Conspiracy (2003)
 Cage – "Weather People" from Weatherproof (2003)
 Nightmares on Wax – "70s 80s (RJD2 Remix)" (2003)
 Elbow – "Fugitive Motel (RJD2 Mix)" (2003)
 Tame One – "Up 2 No Good Again" from When Rappers Attack (2003)
 CunninLynguists – "Seasons" from SouthernUnderground (2003)
 Diverse – "Certified", "Uprock", "Big Game", "Explosive" and "Under the Hammer" from One A.M. (2003)
 Aceyalone – "Lost Your Mind" and "Moonlit Skies" from Love & Hate (2003)
 Babbletron – "The Clock Song" from Mechanical Royalty (2003)
 Vast Aire – "9 Lashes (When Michael Smacks Lucifer)" from Look Mom... No Hands (2004)
 Leak Bros – "Gimmesumdeath" from Waterworld (2004)
 Hikaru Utada – "Devil Inside (RJD2 Remix)" (2004)
 Leela James – "Music (RJD2 Remix)" (2005)
 Cage – "Shoot Frank" from Hell's Winter (2005)
 Astrud Gilberto – "The Gentle Rain (RJD2 Remix)" from Verve Remixed 3 (2005)
 The Go! Team – "Huddle Formation (RJD2 Remix)" from Ladyflash Remixes (2006)
 Pigeon John – "The Last Sunshine" from And the Summertime Pool Party (2006)
 Cool Calm Pete – "Black Friday" from Lost (2006)
 Aceyalone – "Never Come Back", "Angelina Valintina" and "Impact" from Grand Imperial (2006)
 Jack Peñate – "Learning Lines" from Matinée (2007)
 Yo La Tengo – "Here to Fall (RJD2 Remix)" from Here to Fall: Remixes (2010)
 J-Live – "Great Expectations" from S.P.T.A. (2011)
 CunninLynguists – "The Format" from Strange Journey Volume Three (2014)
 Son Little – "Cross My Heart (RJD2 Remix)" from Things I Forgot (2014)
 Tycho – "Apogee (RJD2 Remix)" from Awake Remixes (2016)
 Homeboy Sandman – "Gumshoe" from Kindness for Weakness (2016)

References

External links

 
 
 

1976 births
American hip hop record producers
Living people
Musicians from Eugene, Oregon
Musicians from Ohio
Definitive Jux artists
XL Recordings artists
MHz Legacy members
Soul Position members